The Nebraska Loan and Trust Company Building, also known as the Clarke-Buchanan Building, is a historic building in Hastings, Nebraska. It was built in 1883, and designed in the Italianate architectural style, although the style "conforms to no major American architectural movement." It was the headquarters of the Nebraska Loan and Trust Company from 1884 to 1903, and the Clarke-Buchanan Company  from 1903 to 1931. It has been listed on the National Register of Historic Places since May 1, 1979.

References

National Register of Historic Places in Adams County, Nebraska
Italianate architecture in Nebraska
Buildings and structures completed in 1883